Cody Groat is a Canadian scholar and historian, who focuses on the federal commemoration of Indigenous history from 1919 to present. He is a Kanyen'kehaka citizen and band member of Six Nations of the Grand River.

Early life 
Cody grew up in Ingersoll, Ontario. His grandparents were survivors of the Canadian Indian residential school system, and his father a survivor of the Sixties Scoop.

Education 
Groat holds a Master of Arts in World Heritage Studies from the University of Birmingham and is presently a PhD Candidate in the Department of History at Wilfrid Laurier University.

Career 
Early in his academic career, Groat published a compilation of more than 30 interviews with famous Canadians, including Paul Martin, Kim Campbell, Dan Aykroyd, and Farley Mowat. He is currently an assistant professor at University of Western Ontario in the Department of History and the Indigenous Studies program, where he teaches History of Ontario: From Peopling to Present. As a historian and academic, Cody Groat has become a leading voice on Indigenous issues in relation to Truth and Reconciliation in Canada, providing commentary for news outlets such as The New York Times, CBC News, and Global News. He is a former President of the Board of Directors for the Indigenous Heritage Circle and is currently Chair of the Canadian Commission for UNESCO's Memory of the World National Committee.

Awards 

 2022: Canadian Historical Association's Indigenous History Best Article Prize
 SSHRC Doctoral Fellowship, Social Sciences and Humanities Research Council of Canada (2019-2021)

Publications 

 “Holding Place: Resistance, Reframing and Relationally in the Representation of Indigenous History,” with Kim Anderson, Historic Perspectives Dossier on Commemoration for The Canadian Historical Review, 2021, Vol. 102 (03), pp. 465–484.
 “Commemoration and Reconciliation: The Mohawk Institute as a World Heritage Site,” British Journal of Canadian Studies, 2018, Vol. 31 (2), pp. 195–208.
 Canadian Stories: A Teenaged Adventure with Presidents, Drag Queens and Drug Lords (Rapido Books, 2016)
 “Indigenous Peoples and the UNESCO Memory of the World Programme,” Canadian Commission for UNESCO IdeaLabs Policy Paper, forthcoming.

References 

21st-century Canadian historians